Casape is a  (municipality) in the Metropolitan City of Rome in the Italian region of Latium, located about  east of Rome, on the western slopes of the Monti Prenestini.

Casape borders the following municipalities: Capranica Prenestina, Poli, San Gregorio da Sassola.

References

Cities and towns in Lazio